Johan Fredrik Feyer (16 July 182126 June 1880) was a Norwegian industrial pioneer and factory owner.

He was born in Christiania (now Oslo), Norway. He was the son of Christian Feyer (1793-1879) and Helene Othilie Falck (1792-1865). 
His father was a state official and court administrator  (sorenskriver). While he was young, his family moved to Egersund in Rogaland. He was educated by the parish priest in the parish of Hå with further education in Christiania. During the 1840s, he traveled to Great Britain to study  stoneware production. In 1846 he returned to Egersund where the following year he established a pottery plant, Egersund Potteria, which became Norway's leading stoneware manufacturer during  the 1850s.

From 1865 the factory was known as Egersunds Fayancefabrik, producing the fine tin-glazed pottery on earthenware known as faience. By 1876, the factory encountered a financial crisis  and was administered by the courts. The estate was not insolvent and the factory continued. Feyer was offered a position which he  declined. He subsequently left Egersund and settled  in Christiania.

References

External links
Egersund Fayance Museum

1821 births
1880 deaths
Businesspeople from Oslo
Norwegian company founders
Norwegian industrialists